The table below lists the reasons delivered from the bench by the Supreme Court of Canada during 2003. The table illustrates what reasons were filed by each justice in each case, and which justices joined each reason. This list, however, does not include decisions on motions.

Of the 75 judgments released in 2003, 14 were oral judgments, 49 were unanimous, there was no pluralities, and no motions.

Reasons

Justices of the Supreme Court

External links
 2003 decisions: CanLII LexUM

Reasons Of The Supreme Court Of Canada, 2003
2003